La Vaupalière is a commune in the Seine-Maritime department in the Normandy region in northern France.

Geography
The A151 autoroute passes through the commune's south-eastern section.

Population

Places of interest
 The church of St. Léonard, dating from the sixteenth century.
 A manor house called the chateau of Parquet, from the seventeenth century.

See also
Communes of the Seine-Maritime department

References

Communes of Seine-Maritime